Cosmopolitan Twarda 2/4, formerly known as Twarda Tower or Hines Tower, is a mainly residential skyscraper (160 meters high, 44 storeys) in central Warsaw, Poland. The project was developed by Tacit Development Polska.

Four penthouses are planned to be situated on the top floor. Its ground floor along Twarda Street is to provide commercial space for shops and services and its underground part has been designed to accommodate a 300-vehicle car park.

The first plans of building developed on this plot were revealed in 2006 when Foundation Shalom appointed leading Polish architect Stefan Kuryłowicz to design a tower. Soon after the Foundation was forced through lack of funds to sell the plot to Tacit Development. A new design was prepared by German architect Helmut Jahn. Up to 2011 Hines was the developer of the scheme, but Tacit, the investor behind the scheme, took it over.

Cosmopolitan Twarda 2/4 was the tallest completed residential building in Warsaw, and second in Poland (after Sky Tower in Wrocław). It fell to third place upon Złota 44's completion.

See also
 List of tallest buildings in Poland
 List of tallest buildings in Warsaw

References

External links
 Project on the Hines webpage
 Project on architects' webpage

Skyscrapers in Warsaw
Śródmieście, Warsaw
Residential skyscrapers in Poland
Helmut Jahn buildings
Residential buildings completed in 2015